South of Tahiti is a 1941 American south seas adventure film directed by George Waggner and starring Brian Donlevy. It helped launch Maria Montez as a pin-up star. She played a leading role; response was such that Universal then cast her in Arabian Nights.

Plot
Three pearl hunters wind up stranded on a South Pacific island.

Cast
 Brian Donlevy as Bob
 Broderick Crawford as Chuck
 Andy Devine as Moose
 Maria Montez as Melahi 
 Henry Wilcoxon as Captain Larkin
 H. B. Warner as High Chief Kawalima
 Armida as Tutara
 Abner Biberman as Tahawa
 Ignacio Sáenz as Kuala (as Ignacio Saenz)
 Frank Lackteen as Besar

Production
The film was intended to be Montez's first starring vehicle. It was originally known as Captive Wild Woman and was to star Montez, Brian Donlevy, Broderick Crawford and Andy Devine. Then its name was changed to White Savage. Gerald Geraghty and Ainsworth Morgan were originally reported as working on the script.

Henry Wilcoxon was then announced for the role of the main villain. The script was rewritten so his character survived at the end.

See also
 List of American films of 1941

References

External links 
 
 
Review of film at Variety
 South Seas Cinema

1941 films
Universal Pictures films
Films directed by George Waggner
1941 adventure films
Films scored by Frank Skinner
American adventure films
American black-and-white films
1940s American films